"Help Me Understand" is a song written by Wayne Hector, Steve Mac and Chris Farren, and recorded by American country music artist Trace Adkins.  It was released in March 2002 as the second single from his album Chrome.  The song reached #17 on the Billboard Hot Country Singles & Tracks chart.

Personnel
Compiled from liner notes.

 Trace Adkins — lead vocals
 Tim Akers — keyboards
 Mike Brignardello — bass guitar
 Eric Darken — percussion
 Larry Franklin — fiddle
 Paul Franklin — steel guitar
 John Hobbs — keyboards
 Dann Huff — electric guitar
 Brent Mason — electric guitar
 Chris McHugh — drums
 Russell Terrell — background vocals
 Biff Watson — acoustic guitar

Chart performance

Year-end charts

References

2002 singles
Country ballads
Trace Adkins songs
Music videos directed by Trey Fanjoy
Songs written by Wayne Hector
Songs written by Steve Mac
Song recordings produced by Dann Huff
Capitol Records Nashville singles
Songs written by Chris Farren (country musician)
2001 songs